Frederick Osborne (29 March 1883 – 19 April 1958) was a British boxer. He competed in the men's lightweight event at the 1908 Summer Olympics.

References

External links
 

1883 births
1958 deaths
British male boxers
Olympic boxers of Great Britain
Boxers at the 1908 Summer Olympics
Place of birth missing
Lightweight boxers